The Central Boulevards are a series of grand boulevards in central Brussels, Belgium. They were constructed following the covering of the river Senne (1867–1871), as part of the major urban works by the architect Léon Suys under the tenure of the city's then-mayor, Jules Anspach. They are from south to north and from west to east: the /, the Boulevard Anspach/Anspachlaan, the Boulevard Adolphe Max/Adolphe Maxlaan, and the /.

The covering of the Senne and the completion of the Central Boulevards allowed the construction of the modern public buildings which are focal to downtown Brussels today, including the former Brussels Stock Exchange and the Midi Palace, as well as the reconstruction of the Greater Sluice Gate, south of the city.

History

Origins: covering of the Senne

The Senne/Zenne (French/Dutch) was historically the main waterway of Brussels, but it became more polluted and less navigable as the city grew. By the second half of the 19th century, it had become a serious health hazard and was filled with pollution, garbage and decaying organic matter. It flooded frequently, inundating the lower town and the working class neighbourhoods which surrounded it.

Numerous proposals were made to remedy this problem, and in 1865, the then-mayor of the City of Brussels, Jules Anspach, selected a design by the architect Léon Suys to cover the river and build a series of grand boulevards and public buildings. The project faced fierce opposition and controversy, mostly due to its cost and the need for expropriation and demolition of working-class neighbourhoods. The construction was contracted to a British company, but control was returned to the government following an embezzlement scandal. This delayed the project, but it was still completed in 1871.

The covering of the Senne brought boulevards to the heart of Brussels, whereas they had hitherto been limited to the Small Ring, a series of roadways built on the site of the 14th-century walls bounding the historic city centre. The boulevards, whose initial function was to go around the capital, thus became structural urban thoroughfares. The central boulevards' completion also allowed urban renewal and the construction along them of the modern public buildings of Haussmann-esque style which are characteristic of downtown Brussels today.

Construction and development
The Central Boulevards—the / (now the /), the / (now the Boulevard Anspach/Anspachlaan), the / (now the Boulevard Adolphe Max/Adolphe Maxlaan), and the / (now the /)—were laid out between 1869 and 1871, and were progressively opened to traffic from 1871 to 1873. The opening of these new routes offered a more efficient way to get into Brussels' lower town than the cramped streets such as the /, the / and the Rue Neuve/Nieuwstraat, and helped revitalise the lower quarters of the town.

In order to accomplish this revitalisation and attract investment, public buildings were constructed as part of Léon Suys' massive programme of beautification of the city centre, including the Brussels Stock Exchange (1868–1873). The vast Central Halls, a good example of metallic architecture, located between the / and the /, replaced unhygienic open-air markets, though they were torn down in 1958. The monumental fountain, which was to break the monotony of the boulevards at the Place Fontainas/Fontainasplein, was abandoned for budgetary reasons.

The construction of private buildings on the boulevards and surrounding areas took place later. Brussels' middle class continued to prefer living in new suburbs rather than the cramped areas of the city centre. Besides, the high prices of the land (expected to finance part of the construction costs) and the high rents were not within the means of the lower classes. Moreover, life in apartments was no longer desirable for residents of Brussels, who preferred to live in single family homes. For these reasons, the buildings constructed by private citizens had difficulty finding buyers.

To give builders an incentive to create elaborate and appealing facades on their works, two architectural competitions were organised; first in the period 1872–1876 and again in 1876–1878. Great freedom was given to the architects; no unity of style was sought nor imposed and the monumental composition adopted a de facto eclectic approach throughout the immense perspective of the boulevards. Nonetheless, it took another 20 years, until 1895, for buildings to solidly line the boulevards.

Contemporary (1945–present)

The covering of the Senne and the construction of the Central Boulevards have left deep traces in Brussels' historic centre. The formerly working-class districts have made way for apartment buildings and for the Stock Exchange with its commercial district, department stores, luxury hotels, concert halls, cafés and brasseries. From the end of the Second World War until the late 1970s, the Central Boulevards were subject to urban planners' failed attempts to transform them into urban motorways (see Brusselisation). In spite of this, they have mostly retained their 19th-century appearance to this day.

Since 29 June 2015, the Central Boulevards have been pedestrianised between the Place de la Bourse/Beursplein and the Place de Brouckère/De Brouckèreplein, as part of a broader pedestrianisation of Brussels' city centre. The area, covering , includes much of the historic centre within the Small Ring, such as the Grand-Place/Grote Markt, the Place de Brouckère and the Boulevard Anspach.

The boulevards

Boulevard Maurice Lemonnier
Formerly named the /, the / stretches from the / to the Place Fontainas/Fontainasplein. Interrupted halfway by the Place Anneessens/Anneessensplein (former location of the Old Market), this artery is characterised by a homogeneous succession of low-rise buildings for the most part, bourgeois dwellings with a predilection for the neoclassical style, apartment buildings, and commercial buildings such as the Midi Palace. In 1919, the city council ordered the boulevard to be renamed in honour of the alderman and patriot Maurice Lemonnier (1860–1930), who returned from a long captivity as a prisoner in Germany during World War I. Some remarkable buildings along this relatively well-preserved stretch include the Midi Palace, the Model School (currently Charles Buls Primary School), the former Municipal School no. 13 (currently the ) on the Place Anneessens, as well as the old Castellani rotunda (now transformed into a parking lot).

Boulevard Anspach

Central by its original name as much as by its location, the Boulevard Anspach/Anspachlaan connects the Place Fontainas to the Place de Brouckère. In 1879, it was renamed in honour of Jules Anspach (1829–1879), the former mayor of the City of Brussels who instigated these works. Among the most important buildings on the Central Boulevards are concentrated there: the former Brussels Stock Exchange building, major shops and entertainment venues, and formerly markets and department stores (Grand Bazar Anspach and Grands Magasins de la Bourse). Large buildings, several of which bear the signature of the French promoter Mosnier, are adjacent to hotels (Grand Hotel and Hotel Central), cafés, cinemas, theatres, and concert halls (Pathé Palace cinema, Bourse Theatre and Ancienne Belgique). Some remarkable buildings on this section include the former Stock Exchange on the Place de la Bourse, as well as Anspach Gallery.

Boulevard Adolphe Max

Unlike the other sections of the Central Boulevards, the Boulevard Adolphe Max/Adolphe Maxlaan (formerly the /) does not cover the Senne. It doubles with the / and connects the Place de Brouckère to the /, forming a "Y" crossroad with the Boulevard Émile Jacqmain. It is characterised by five-level buildings on average, monumental in appearance for the most part. A dozen of them belong to the Haussmann-esque vein in the Second Empire style. Others, of neoclassical inspiration, are distinguished by the decoration of their balconies, windows, and pediments. In 1919, it was renamed in honour of the then-mayor of the City of Brussels, Adolphe Max (1869–1939). Remarkable buildings on this stretch include the House of Cats, the entrance of the Northern Passage glazed shopping arcade, as well as the luxurious Hotel Le Plaza and Hotel Atlanta.

Boulevard Émile Jacqmain
Connecting the Place de Brouckère to the Boulevard du Jardin Botanique and the /, the Boulevard Émile Jacqmain forms the western branch of the fork which marks the northern end of the Central Boulevards. Sumptuous in its time, the former / (because it follows the course of the river) was bordered by apartment buildings, commercial buildings, luxury hotels, town houses, and some bourgeois dwellings, which have now mostly been replaced by offices. Eclectic styles dominate with a good representation of the Second Empire. Functionalism and Art Deco are also represented by some buildings typical of the interwar period.

See also

 List of streets in Brussels
 Haussmann's renovation of Paris
 History of Brussels
 Belgium in "the long nineteenth century"

References

Notes

Bibliography
 
 
 

Streets in Brussels
City of Brussels
19th century in Brussels
Urban planning in Belgium
Car-free zones in Europe
Subterranean rivers